Hillman is a village in the Alpena and Montmorency counties in the U.S. state of Michigan. The population was 638 in 2019. Nearly all of the village is located within Hillman Township (Montmorency County), with only a small portion extending into Green Township (Alpena County). Hillman        is the only village of both counties, while also being the only incorporated municipality in Montmorency County.

History
Hillman was the county seat of Montmorency County from 1881 until the removal of the county seat to Atlanta in 1891.

Geography

Transportation

Major highways
 bypasses the village to turn east into Alpena County.
 runs through Hillman.
 is a county-designated highway running through the village, ending at M-32 south of Hillman.

Trails
 Alpena to Hillman Trail

Demographics

2010 census
As of the census of 2010, there were 701 people, 300 households, and 158 families living in the village. The racial makeup of the village was 97.9% White, 0.1% African American, 0.7% Native American, 0.1% Asian, 0.1% from other races, and 1.0% from two or more races. Hispanic or Latino of any race were 1.4% of the population.

There were 300 households, of which 20.3% had children under the age of 18 living with them, 35.0% were married couples living together, 14.7% had a female householder with no husband present, 3.0% had a male householder with no wife present, and 47.3% were non-families. 43.3% of all households were made up of individuals, and 24.4% had someone living alone who was 65 years of age or older. The average household size was 2.02 and the average family size was 2.73.

The median age in the village was 51.4 years. 17% of residents were under the age of 18; 5.3% were between the ages of 18 and 24; 17.5% were from 25 to 44; 29.1% were from 45 to 64; and 31.2% were 65 years of age or older. The gender makeup of the village was 46.2% male and 53.8% female.

2000 census
As of the census of 2000, there were 685 people, 288 households, and 154 families living in the village. The racial makeup of the village was 98.98% White, 0.15% African American, and 0.88% Native American. Hispanic or Latino of any race were 1.46% of the population.

There were 288 households, out of which 24.3% had children under the age of 18 living with them, 35.8% were married couples living together, 14.2% had a female householder with no husband present, and 46.5% were non-families. 42.0% of all households were made up of individuals, and 26.7% had someone living alone who was 65 years of age or older.  The average household size was 2.06 and the average family size was 2.75.

In the village, the population was spread out, with 17.8% under the age of 18, 6.6% from 18 to 24, 17.8% from 25 to 44, 23.1% from 45 to 64, and 34.7% who were 65 years of age or older.  The median age was 51 years. For every 100 females, there were 74.3 males.  For every 100 females age 18 and over, there were 64.1 males.

The median income for a household in the village was $21,250, and the median income for a family was $31,771. Males had a median income of $28,438 versus $23,125 for females. The per capita income for the village was $13,818.  About 12.8% of families and 14.7% of the population were below the poverty line, including 16.3% of those under age 18 and 13.4% of those age 65 or over.

References

Villages in Alpena County, Michigan
Villages in Montmorency County, Michigan
Villages in Michigan